Smilja Marjanović-Dušanić (born 29 March 1963) is a Serbian historian and professor at the University of Belgrade Faculty of Philosophy. She is specializing in medieval studies.

Marjanović-Dušanić was born in Belgrade, SR Serbia, SFR Yugoslavia. She received her Master's degree in 1986, and Master of Advanced Studies in 1991, from the University of Belgrade. Awarded with a Doctorate in 1996 with the work Vladarska ideologija Nemanjića: diplomatička studija, she started working as a Docent in the Department of History at the Belgrade Faculty of Philosophy the next year. She was re-elected Docent in 2003.

Works

Vladarske insignije i državna simbolika u Srbiji od XIII do XV veka (1994)
The Rulers’ Insignia in the Structural Evolution of Medieval Serbia (1999)
The Zion Symbolics of the Monastery of Chilandari (2000)
The New Constantine in serbian medieval hagiography (2001)
Rex imago Dei (2002)
Privatni život u srpskim zemljama srednjeg veka (2004)
Les prières de Saint Syméon et saint Sava dans le programme monarchique du roi Milutin (2004)
Dynastie et sainteté à l’époque de la famille des Lazarević: exemples anciens et nouveaux modèles (2006)
The making of a Saint in medieval Serbia: sovereign as martyr (2006)
L’idéologie monarchique de la dynastie des Némanide (2006)

Sveti kralj (2007)
“L’altérité“ dans le témoignage des récits hagiographiques serbes: l’exemple des Vies de Théodose (2007)
 
 "L'écriture et la sainteté dans la Serbie médiévale. Étude d'hagiographie" (2017)

References

Sources

External links

Serbian medievalists
1963 births
University of Belgrade alumni
Academic staff of the University of Belgrade
Serbian women writers
Living people
Women medievalists